Lathones (/lə'θonz/) is a village in Fife, Scotland, located approximately 6 miles (10 km) south west of St Andrews, in the parish of Cameron in the Riggin o Fife.

The place-name Lathones if first attested abtween 1452 and 1480 as Lathone. The etymology is uncertain but thought to be from Scottish Gaelic leth ('half, side') and tòn ('backside, arse'). If so, the name was once leth thòine ('the half of the rounded hill').

Lathones was formerly a mining village.

One of the main attractions at Lathones is the Inn at Lathones, which features regular live music acts, and has included famous artists such as Henry McCullough (former guitarist of Paul McCartney's band Wings) and Bob Catley (singer from the band  Magnum). The Inn at Lathones won the award of "Music Pub of the Year" at the Publican Awards in 2008.

See also
 Mundell music

References

Villages in Fife
Mining communities in Fife